Indrė Marija Girdauskaitė (born 28 April 1998) is a Lithuanian female diver that specialises in springboard events.

Indrė Girdauskaitė competed in 2015 World Aquatics Championships, where she finished 34th and 42nd in individual events. In 2017 World Aquatics Championships Girduskaitė together with Genevieve Angerame was a first Lithuanian female duo to compete in synchronised diving event and finished in 18th place.

In 2019, she finished in 40th place in the preliminary round in the women's 1 metre springboard event at the 2019 World Aquatics Championships held in Gwangju, South Korea. In the women's 3 metre springboard event she finished in 48th place in the preliminary round.

References

External links 
The Sports profile

1998 births
Living people
Lithuanian female divers
Divers at the 2015 European Games
European Games competitors for Lithuania